Colonel Edward Meeker Haight (May 30, 1896 – December 5, 1975) was a flying ace when he served as a lieutenant in World War I. He was credited with five aerial victories, all against German fighter planes.

World War I service

Haight scored his victories in just over a month, from 28 September through 30 October 1918, while flying a Spad.

Between the World Wars
Postwar, Haight pursued a career in the U. S. flying service, although he interrupted his service time at some point for approximately six years. He flew as an airline pilot in Central America, and maintained his reserve commission. He was recalled to active duty for World War II.

World War II and beyond
During World War II, he rose to the rank of colonel and briefly commanded Randolph AFB in 1942. In 1950, he was culled from the officer's ranks and chose to enlist as a noncommissioned officer rather than leave the military; this allowed him to complete his 30 years for retirement. He retired on 3 May 1954 at Randolph AFB, after serving four years as a master sergeant in the School of Aviation Medicine.

Relation
His son 2nd Lt Edward Haight was Missing in action on 18 July 1944 during World War II.

See also

 List of World War I flying aces from the United States

References

Bibliography
 Over the Front: A Complete Record of the Fighter Aces and Units of the United States and French Air Services, 1914-1918. Norman L. R. Franks, Frank W. Bailey. Grub Street, 1992. , .
 SPAD XII/XIII Aces of World War I. Jon Guttman. Osprey Publishing, 2002. , .

1896 births
1975 deaths
Commercial aviators
United States Army Air Service pilots of World War I
United States Army Air Forces personnel of World War II
United States Army Air Forces colonels
United States Air Force non-commissioned officers